Dialysis dispar is a species of fly in the family Xylophagidae.

Distribution
Canada, United States.

References

Further reading

 

Xylophagidae
Insects described in 1879
Taxa named by Francis Walker (entomologist)
Diptera of North America